Stephen Flynn (died 24 November 1960) was an Irish Fianna Fáil politician. He was first elected to Dáil Éireann as a Fianna Fáil Teachta Dála (TD) at the 1932 general election for the Leitrim–Sligo constituency. He was re-elected at each subsequent general election up to 1957. He died in 1960 during the 16th Dáil, a by-election was held on 1 March 1961 which was won by Joseph McLoughlin of Fine Gael.

Flynn was the longest serving Chairman of Leitrim County Council.

References

Year of birth missing
1960 deaths
Fianna Fáil TDs
Members of the 7th Dáil
Members of the 8th Dáil
Members of the 9th Dáil
Members of the 10th Dáil
Members of the 11th Dáil
Members of the 12th Dáil
Members of the 13th Dáil
Members of the 14th Dáil
Members of the 15th Dáil
Members of the 16th Dáil
Politicians from County Leitrim